Bembibre is a municipality and a city located in the region of El Bierzo, province of León, Castile and León, Spain. According to the 2014 census (INE), the municipality had a population of 9,631 inhabitants. The second largest urban settlement in the region of El Bierzo, it is considered as the capital of traditional shire called "Bierzo Alto". Two rivers  crosses Bembibre: Boeza and Noceda.

History 
The numerous remains of Cisastur fortifications (castros) found along the city's surroundings prove that man has inhabited these lands from ancient times. However, the origin of the current settlements goes back to the repopulations made in the Middle Ages during the centuries ninth through eleventh, linked to the Church and the edification of several monasteries in the region.

Language 
As in the rest of the community of Castilla y León, Spanish is the most widely spoken language and the language of instruction in schools.

See also
 Province of León
 El Bierzo
 Bierzo Edict

References

Municipalities in El Bierzo